National Agency Check with Local Agency and Credit Checks  (NACLC) is a type of background check required in the United States for granting of security clearances.

According to the United States Office of Personnel Management, Federal Investigations Notice, Executive Order Number 12968, signed by President Clinton in 1995, outlines NACLC as follows:

The NACLC will be used as the initial investigation for contractors at the Confidential, Secret, and L access levels. It will also be used as the reinvestigation product for both contractors and Federal employees at the same access levels.

This new product includes:

Basic National Agency Checks (Security/Suitability Investigations Index, Defense Central Index of Investigations, fingerprint classification, and a search of the Federal Bureau of Investigation's investigative index).

Credit search covering all residence, employment, and education locations during the last 7 years.

Law Checks covering all locations of residence, employment, and education during the last 5 years and to all locations of admitted arrest. If 35-day service is requested, all law checks will be scheduled by Record Search. If 75-day service is requested, law checks will be scheduled by a combination of inquiry and record coverage.

See Single Scope Background Investigation for more information.

References

National security
United States government secrecy
Credit